Yucca linearifolia is a plant species in the family Asparagaceae, native to the Chihuahuan Desert in the Mexican states of Coahuila and Nuevo Leon. It is a tree-like perennial up to 3.5 m tall, with narrow, denticulate leaves and fleshy fruits.

References

External links
photo of herbarium specimen at Missouri Botanical Garden, isotype of Yucca linearifolia

linearifolia
Plants described in 1995
Flora of Mexico
Flora of Coahuila
Flora of Nuevo León